Amietia chapini is a species of frog in the family Pyxicephalidae.  It was formerly placed in the family Ranidae.

Distribution and habitat
It is endemic to the Pangi Territory of the Democratic Republic of the Congo. Its natural habitats are subtropical or tropical moist lowland forests and rivers.

References

Amphibians of Sub-Saharan Africa
amieti
Amphibians described in 1976
Endemic fauna of the Democratic Republic of the Congo